I just wanna hold you tight is the 24th single of the Japanese pop singer and songwriter Miho Komatsu released under Giza studio label. It was released 18 May 2005. The single reached #36 and sold 5,294 copies. It is charted for 3 weeks and, in total, sold 6,932 copies.

Track listing
All songs are written and composed by Miho Komatsu
"I just wanna hold you tight"
arrangement: Satoru Kobayashi
it is used as an ending song for the TV Tokyo anime series MÄR.

arrangement: Yoshinobu Ohga
 
arrangement: Hirohito Furui (Garnet Crow)
"I just wanna hold you tight" (instrumental)

References 

Anime songs
2005 singles
Miho Komatsu songs
Songs written by Miho Komatsu
2005 songs
Giza Studio singles
Being Inc. singles
Song recordings produced by Daiko Nagato